Charles Watson may refer to:
Charles Watson (businessman), American businessman, founder of The Natural Gas Clearinghouse, later renamed Dynegy
Charles Watson (musician), is a British musician who used to be one half of the band Slow Club before going solo
Charles Watson (Royal Navy officer) (1714–1757), British naval officer, governor of Newfoundland
Charles Watson (Wisconsin legislator) (1836–1910), Republican member of the Wisconsin State Assembly
Charles A. Watson (1871–1948), President of the American University in Cairo
Charles Boog Watson (1858–1947), Scottish engineer and antiquarian
Charles G. M. Watson (1878–1961), Australian national chess champion
Charles H. Watson (1877–1962), Seventh-day Adventist minister and administrator
C. J. Watson (born 1984), American professional basketball player
Charles W. Watson (1915–2002), American sculptor
Charles Watson-Wentworth, 2nd Marquess of Rockingham (1730–1782), Whig Prime Minister of the United Kingdom
Chub Watson (Charles Watson, 1915–1971), American professional basketball player
Tex Watson (Charles Denton Watson, Jr., born 1945), American murderer